The year 1944 in archaeology involved some significant events.

Excavations
 August - Excavations in the bombed area of Canterbury, England, are begun.
 "Caesar's Camp" (pre-Roman) site at location of London Heathrow Airport.

Publications
 Paul Jacobsthal's Early Celtic Art published in Oxford.

Finds
 First find of 12th century Kilwa Sultanate copper coins on Marchinbar Island off the north coast of Australia.

Events
 31 May - Nemi ships destroyed by fire.
 The Council for British Archaeology is formed.
 Mortimer Wheeler is appointed Director-General of the Archaeological Survey of India.

Births
 1 March - Dai Morgan Evans, British archaeologist (d. 2017)
 6 July - Timothy W. Potter, English archaeologist (d. 2000)
 10 July - Norman Hammond, British Mayanist
 15 July - Nigel Williams, British conservator (d. 1992)
 25 July - David Breeze, British archaeologist notable for work on Hadrian's Wall, the Antonine Wall and the Roman Army
 19 December - Richard Leakey, Kenyan palaeoanthropologist (d. 2022)
 Gabriel Barkay, Hungarian-born Israeli archaeologist

References

Archaeology
Archaeology
Archaeology by year